The Grande Fourche is a mountain in the Mont Blanc Massif, located on the Swiss-French border. It lies between the Glacier de Saleina (Valais) and the Glacier du Tour (Haute-Savoie).

References

External links
 Grande Fourche on Hikr

Mountains of the Alps
Alpine three-thousanders
Mountains of Valais
Mountains of Haute-Savoie
International mountains of Europe
France–Switzerland border
Mountains of Switzerland